Morgan is a surname of Welsh, Irish and Scottish origin.

Origins and variants 
The Welsh surname is derived from the Old Welsh personal name "Morcant", which is of an uncertain origin.  The surname "Morgan" traces its origin from the powerful Welsh family established c. 1330 by Morgan ap Llewelyn (son of Llewelyn ap Ifor, Lord of St. Clere, and Angharad, daughter and heiress of Sir Morgan ap Maredudd (Meredith), Lord of Tredegar), and is of Welsh origin, meaning either "great kingdom" or "great hundred". It is a popular family name in Wales, as well as there being a group of "Morgan"s from "Morgund". It is possible that the name was Celtic from the Cornovii Tribe who lived in the North of Scotland and in the Severn Valley, near the Wrekin in Shropshire. The County of Glamorgan is named after the Princes of South Wales named "Morgan", a group, part of which developed into the name Leyshon. The term for water sprites in Welsh is morgans.

At the time of the British Census of 1881, the frequency of the surname "Morgan" was highest in Brecknockshire (over 16 times the national average), followed by Monmouthshire, Glamorgan, Carmarthenshire, Radnorshire, Montgomeryshire, Cardiganshire, Pembrokeshire, Herefordshire, and Shropshire.

Clan Morgan is the designation for the Mackays of the Reay Country and the surname is also found in Aberdeenshire. The Pictish form is Morgunn.

People with the surname
Adam Morgan (disambiguation), several people
Alex Morgan (born 1989), American soccer player
Alton Morgan (1932-2022), American politician and businessman
Alun Morgan (1928–2018), British jazz critic and writer
Andrew Morgan (disambiguation), several people
Anne Morgan, Baroness Hunsdon
Aaron Morgan, American footballer
Aaron Morgan (rugby league)
Arthur E. Morgan, Chairman of the TVA under Franklin Roosevelt, prolific writer
Ashtone Morgan (born 1991), Canadian soccer player
Barry Morgan (disambiguation), several people
Bob Morgan (disambiguation), several people named Bob or Bobby
Bonnie Morgan, contortionist and actress
Carroll Morgan (boxer), Canadian heavyweight boxer
Carroll Morgan (computer scientist), American-Australian computer scientist
Chad Morgan, Australian country music singer and guitarist
Chad Morgan (actress), American actress
Charles Waln Morgan, whaling executive
Chris Morgan (disambiguation), several people
Clement G. Morgan, attorney, civil rights activist, and public official
Cliff Morgan, Welsh rugby union player
C. Lloyd Morgan, British psychologist known by "Morgan's Canon"
Colin Morgan, Northern Irish actor, star of television series Merlin
Conor Morgan, Canadian basketball player
Cory Morgan (disambiguation), several people
Dale Morgan, American historian of the American west
Dan Morgan, American football player
Daniel Morgan, brigadier general in the Continental Army in the American Revolution
David Morgan (disambiguation), several people
Debelah Morgan, American singer
Dell Morgan (1900–1962), American college sports coach
Dennis Morgan, actor
Denroy Morgan, Jamaican American reggae artist
Dermot Morgan, Irish actor best known as Father Ted
Derrick Morgan (born 1989), NFL player
Diane Morgan, English actress, comedian and writer
Don Morgan, Canadian politician
Doug Morgan (disambiguation), several people
Ed Morgan (professor), Canadian professor
Edgar Morgan (disambiguation), several people
Edward Morgan (disambiguation), several people
Elaine Morgan (writer), Welsh writer, advocate of the aquatic ape hypothesis
Eli Morgan (born 1996), American baseball pitcher for the Cleveland Indians
Elizabeth Chambers Morgan (1850–1944), American labor organizer
Eoin Morgan, Irish cricketer
Frank Morgan (1890–1949), American actor
Frederick E. Morgan, British lieutenant-general in the Second World War
Garrett A. Morgan (1877–1963), African American inventor
Gavin Morgan (born 1976), Canadian ice hockey player
George Morgan (disambiguation), several people
Gerry Morgan (born 1953), Canadian entrepreneur
Gladys Morgan (1898–1983), Welsh comedian
Godfrey Morgan, 1st Viscount Tredegar, Welsh philanthropist
Gramps Morgan, real name Roy Morgan, Jamaican American reggae artist
Harry Morgan (1915–2011), American actor best known for his role in the TV series M*A*S*H
Helen Morgan (1900-1941), American actress
Helen Morgan (politician), British politician
Henry Morgan (disambiguation), several people
Henry Morgan, Sir Henry Morgan AKA Captain Morgan, Welsh privateer and governor of Jamaica
Huey Morgan, American musician, founder member and guitarist of the Fun Lovin' Criminals
Ian Morgan, English professional footballer
Isabel Morgan (marr. Mountain), American virologist at Johns Hopkins, daughter of Thomas Hunt Morgan
Ivor Morgan, Welsh international rugby union player
J. P. Morgan (disambiguation), several people
J. R. Morgan, British academic and author
Jack Morgan (disambiguation), multiple people
Jacques de Morgan, French geologist, archeologist and discoverer of the Hammurabi Code
James Morgan (disambiguation), several people
Jason Morgan (disambiguation), several people
Jedediah Morgan (1774-1826), New York politician
Jeffrey Dean Morgan (born 1966), American actor
Jennifer Morgan (born 1971), American business leader, Co-CEO at SAP SE
Jim Morgan (disambiguation), several people
Jimmy Morgan, English footballer and Royal Marines commando
Joe Morgan (disambiguation), several people
Joe Morgan (1943–2020), American Hall of Fame baseball player and sportscaster
Joe "Pegleg" Morgan (1929–1993), American fugitive
John Morgan (disambiguation), several people
John Hunt Morgan, American Civil War cavalry general CSA
Jordan Morgan (American football) (born 1994), American football player
Joseph Morgan (disambiguation), several people
Josh Morgan, NFL wide receiver
Julia Morgan, American architect
Julie Morgan, Labour MP for Cardiff North
Junius Spencer Morgan, American banker and financier
Justin Morgan (disambiguation), several people
Juwan Morgan (born 1997), American basketball player
Karl Z. Morgan (1907–1999), American physicist
Kate Morgan, American woman who died under mysterious circumstances, and is thought by locals to now haunt the Hotel del Coronado in Coronado, California
Katie Morgan, American pornographic actress
Kathryn Morgan (born 1988), American ballet dancer
Keith Morgan (judoka), Canadian judoka
Kenneth O. Morgan, Welsh historian
Kevin Morgan (disambiguation), multiple people
Laza Morgan, real name Otiyah Morgan, Jamaican American solo singer, also in hip hop band LMS
Lael Morgan (1936-2022),American journalist and author
Lee Morgan  (1938-1972), American jazz trumpeter
Lewis H. Morgan (1818-1881), American politician and anthropologist
Lewis L. Morgan (1876-1950), Louisiana politician
Lionel Morgan (disambiguation), multiple people
Liv Morgan (born 1994), ring name of American professional wrestler Gionna Daddio
Lorin Morgan-Richards, author/publisher of Welsh descent
Lorrie Morgan, country music singer
Marabel Morgan (born 1937), American author
Mary Kimball Morgan (1861–1948), American educator and college president
Matt Morgan (born 1976), American professional wrestler
Maverick Morgan (born 1994), American football player
Meli'sa Morgan (born 1964), American singer-songwriter
Michael Morgan (disambiguation), several people
Michèle Morgan (1920–2016), French film and television actress
Michelle Morgan (disambiguation), several people named Michele and Michelle
Middy Morgan (1828–1892), Irish-born American journalist
Mohammed Said Hersi Morgan, Somali warlord
Morgan Morgan (1688–1766), First settler in present day West Virginia
Morris Hicky Morgan (1859–1910), professor of classical philology and translator of Vitruvius
Nathan Morgan, English long jumper
Nicky Morgan, former MP for Loughborough (6 May 2010 – 6 November 2019)
Olly Morgan, England and Gloucester Rugby Union player
Paul Morgan (disambiguation), multiple people
Peter Morgan (disambiguation), several people
Piers Morgan (born 1965), British broadcaster and former tabloid newspaper editor
Raphael Morgan, Jamaican-American priest of the Ecumenical Patriarchate, and thought to be the first Black Orthodox clergyman in America
Read Morgan (1931–2022), American film and television actor
Rhodri Morgan, former First Minister of Wales
Richard Morgan (disambiguation), multiple people
Richie Morgan, Welsh footballer and manager
Rich Morgan, (born 1971), American entrepreneur 
Robert Burren Morgan, American politician
Robert W. Morgan, American adventurer, first man to descend the Gauley and Meadow rivers in West Virginia, founded Morgan's Canoe Livery
Roger Morgan (1946) English footballer, QPR, Tottenham.
Ryan Morgan, Australian Rugby league player
Sally Morgan (disambiguation), several people
Shaun Morgan, lead singer of the band Seether
Sheryl Morgan, sprinter
Simon Morgan, English football (soccer) player
Sophia Morgan, Fijian sailor
Sophie Morgan (born 1985), British television presenter
Sophie Morgan (author) (born 1979), British author
Sophie Morgan (singer-songwriter) (born 1997), English singer-songwriter
Stanley Morgan (author), English actor & author
Stanley Morgan, wide receiver in American gridiron football
Stanley Morgan Jr. (born 1996), American football player
Steve Morgan (disambiguation), several people
Sylvanus Morgan (1620 – March 27, 1693), English arms-painter and author
Tanner Morgan (born 1999), American football player
Tara Morgan, Australian rules footballer
Ted Morgan (boxer), New Zealand boxer
Ted Morgan (writer) (born 1932), French-American biographer, journalist, and historian
Teddy Morgan, Welsh international rugby union player
Terence Morgan (1921–2005), English actor
Thomas Morgan (disambiguation), several people
Tom Morgan (disambiguation), several people
Tracy Morgan, American actor and comedian
Trevor Morgan (disambiguation), several people
Wallace Morgan, World War I artist in the United States Army Art Program
Wendy Morgan (disambiguation), several people
Wes Morgan, Jamaican footballer
Widow Morgan, a founding settler of Norwalk, Connecticut
William Morgan (disambiguation), several people

Fictional characters
Arthur Morgan, protagonist of the video game Red Dead Redemption 2
Dexter Morgan, serial killer
Eugene Morgan from The Magnificent Ambersons
Hank Morgan from A Connecticut Yankee in King Arthur's Court
Trevor Morgan in the British soap opera EastEnders
 Alice Morgan in the British crime drama Luther
Derek Morgan in the American crime drama Criminal Minds
 Organ Morgan in Dylan Thomas' Under Milk Wood
 Kendrix Morgan in Power Rangers Lost Galaxy
 Kate Morgan, lead character in 24: Live Another Day
 Henry Morgan, lead character of Forever TV series
Jason Morgan (General Hospital), Mob Enforcer on the ABC Daytime Soap Opera General Hospital
Samara Morgan, evil killer in The Ring
Jenna Morgan from Arthur
Nwabudike Morgan, CEO (and, by extension, leader) of the faction Morgan Industries in Sid Meier's Alpha Centauri.
Kendall Morgan, a character in the Power Rangers Dino Charge.
Francis York Morgan and Francis Zach Morgan, protagonist of the 2010 video game Deadly Premonition.

See also
Justice Morgan (disambiguation)
Morgans (surname)

References
Internet surname database: Morgan
Wiki Name
 Abella, Alex (2000). The Great American: A Novel. Simon & Schuster. 
 Crawford, Donald (1997). Michael and Natasha. Scribner 
 Pope, Dudley (2001). Harry Morgan's Way: The Biography of Sir Henry Morgan 1635–1684 House of Stratus 
 Strouse, Jean (2000). Morgan: American Financier. Harper Perennial. 

Surnames of Welsh origin
Welsh-language surnames
English-language surnames